Zittel is a surname. Notable people with the surname include:

Andrea Zittel (born 1965), American sculptor
Julius Zittel (1869–1939), American architect
Karl Alfred von Zittel (1839–1904), German paleontologist
Karl Zittel (1802–1871), German Protestant theologian
Michael Zittel (born 1951), German actor